New Lenox Township is located in the heart of Will County, Illinois, on U.S. Route 30 and Interstate 80. As of the 2010 census, its population was 40,270, and it contained 13,721 housing units.  New Lenox Township has thirty-six square miles within its jurisdiction. It serves almost all of the Village of New Lenox and parts of the individual municipalities of Mokena, Homer Glen, Joliet and the entire unincorporated areas of the New Lenox community.  New Lenox Township changed its name from Vernon Township on June 10, 1850.

New Lenox Township provides general assistance to needy families, the fair and equal assessment of all real estate, and bridge and storm water system maintenance outside the municipality. New Lenox also provides environmental programs, mosquito abatement, transit services, senior housing, family, senior and youth service programs and the administration, maintenance and preservation of the local Marshall and Maplewood Cemeteries.

Current officials 

 Michael B. Hickey - Supervisor
 Bonnie Hernandez - Assessor
 Ron Sly - Road Commissioner
 Keifer Keigher - Collector
 Larry Wennlund - Trustee
 Martin Boban - Trustee
 Barbara Kaupas - Trustee
 Kathy Hilton - Trustee
 Sue Smith - Clerk

Geography

Demographics

References

External links
New Lenox Township Official Site
New Lenox Township Clerk Site

New Lenox was also known as Spencer during the early 1900s.

Townships in Will County, Illinois
Townships in Illinois
1850 establishments in Illinois